On the Corner Where You Live is the fourth studio album by Australian band The Paper Kites, released on 21 September 2018 through Nettwerk, almost half year after On the Train Ride Home. The album was produced by The Paper Kites and Peter Katis.

At the ARIA Music Awards of 2019, On the Corner Where You Live was nominated for Best Adult Contemporary Album.

Background 
Guitarist Dave Prowys said in an interview that when Sam Bentley was writing the lyrics for On the Train Ride Home and On the Corner Where You Live, he was inspired by old noir films and Frank Sinatra albums.

He also referred to the album artwork: "He came across Gina's work and showed it to us and we all loved it", adding that "the idea of the artwork is two people who could be linked or maybe not – it's up to the listener to decide. It's painting a picture of part of a story for two people".

Critical reception 
The AU Reviews Tim Byrnes compared the album with the previous release, On the Train Ride Home, saying that "the two albums are like Ying and Yang – two different sides that make up a whole [...] The two sound very different: the former is acoustic and spare like their earlier work, while the latter is fuller and with an 80s dream pop influence". Stacks Jeff Jenkins referred to the album sound: "There's a touching simplicity to The Paper Kites' work, but it's a sophisticated sound, [...] the result is a record that oozes class, [...] there's no other Australian band quite like them", and described the album as "atmospheric and assured".

Radio Western's Anika In't Ho said that the album "is an enjoyable album with sweet instrumentals and powerful lyrics. The album is nice and soothing with melodic slow songs that feature amazing guitar riffs, saxophone solos and drum beats", concluding that the album is a "fantastic album with uplifting saxophone and guitar production as well as raw lyrics about life".

Track listing

Personnel 
Credits adapted from On the Corner Where You Live notes.

The Paper Kites
 Sam Bentley – lead vocals
 Christina Lacy – vocals
 David Powys – guitars
 Josh Bentley – drums
 Sam Rasmussen – bass guitar

Design
 Jefferton James – artwork
 Gina Higgins – album cover, painting

Production
 The Paper Kites – production, arrangements
 Peter Katis – production, engineering, mixing
 Sam Bentley – recording assistance, layout
 Greg Calbi – mastering
 Gabe Wolf – recording assistance
 Greg Giorgio – recording assistance
 Samuel Rasmussen – recording assistance

Recording
 Recorded at Tarquin Studios (Bridgeport, Connecticut)

Charts

References

2018 albums
The Paper Kites albums
Nettwerk Records albums